Sjælør station is a railway station on the Køge radial of the S-train network in Copenhagen, Denmark.

See also
 List of railway stations in Denmark

References

Railway stations in Valby
S-train (Copenhagen) stations